American Lyric Theater (ALT) is an opera company based in New York City and they specialize in the development of new works. It was founded by Lawrence Edelson in 2005.

Programs 
American Lyric Theater's  Composer Librettist Development Program is the only full-time mentorship initiative for emerging operatic writers in the United States. ALT also commissions new operas with the goal of developing a new body of repertoire and attracting new audiences to opera.

Commissions 
American Lyric Theater commissioned The Golden Ticket, a new opera based on Roald Dahl's book, Charlie and the Chocolate Factory, by American composer Peter Ash and British librettist Donald Sturrock. The Golden Ticket was commissioned by ALT in partnership with Felicity Dahl, and received its world premiere at Opera Theatre of Saint Louis on June 13, 2010. The company also commissioned The Poe Project, a trilogy of one act operas inspired by the fiction of Edgar Allan Poe: Buried Alive by composer Jeff Myers and librettist Quincy Long; ...of the Flesh by composer Jay Anthony Gach and librettist Royce Vavrek; and Embedded by composer Patrick Soluri and librettist Deborah Brevoort. The Poe Project received a workshop reading at New York's Symphony Space in November 2010 and is being further developed by ALT for future staged production.

Faculty and artistic mentorship team 
American Lyric Theater's faculty and artistic mentorship team includes composer/librettist Mark Adamo, composer Daniel Catán, composer Anthony Davis, dramaturg Cori Ellison, librettist Michael Korie, director Rhoda Levine, and librettist William M. Hoffman.

References

External links
American Lyric Theater official website
Opera America Membership Directory: American Lyric Theater 

New York City opera companies
Musical groups established in 2005
2005 establishments in New York City